In mathematics, a principal ideal domain, or PID, is an integral domain in which every ideal is principal, i.e., can be generated by a single element. More generally, a principal ideal ring is a nonzero commutative ring whose ideals are principal, although some authors (e.g., Bourbaki) refer to PIDs as principal rings. The distinction is that a principal ideal ring may have zero divisors whereas a principal ideal domain cannot.

Principal ideal domains are thus mathematical objects that behave somewhat like the integers, with respect to divisibility: any element of a PID has a unique decomposition into prime elements (so an analogue of the fundamental theorem of arithmetic holds); any two elements of a PID have a greatest common divisor (although it may not be possible to find it using the Euclidean algorithm).

Principal ideal domains are noetherian, they are  integrally closed, they are unique factorization domains and Dedekind domains.  All Euclidean domains and all fields are principal ideal domains.

Principal ideal domains appear in the following chain of class inclusions:

Examples
Examples include:
 : any field,
 : the ring of integers,
 : rings of polynomials in one variable with coefficients in a field. (The converse is also true, i.e. if  is a PID then  is a field.) Furthermore, a ring of formal power series in one variable over a field is a PID since every ideal is of the form ,
 : the ring of Gaussian integers,
  (where  is a primitive cube root of 1): the Eisenstein integers,
 Any discrete valuation ring, for instance the ring of -adic integers .

Non-examples 
Examples of integral domains that are not PIDs:

  is an example of a ring which is not a unique factorization domain, since  Hence it is not a principal ideal domain because principal ideal domains are unique factorization domains.

: the ring of all polynomials with integer coefficients. It is not principal because  is an example of an ideal that cannot be generated by a single polynomial.
: rings of polynomials in two variables. The ideal  is not principal.
Most rings of algebraic integers are not principal ideal domains because they have ideals which are not generated by a single element. This is one of the main motivations behind Dedekind's definition of Dedekind domains since a prime integer can no longer be factored into elements, instead they are prime ideals. In fact many  for the p-th root of unity  are not principal ideal domains . In fact, the class number of a ring of algebraic integers  gives a notion of "how far away" it is from being a principal ideal domain.

Modules

The key result is the structure theorem:  If R is a principal ideal domain, and M is a finitely
generated R-module, then  is a direct sum of cyclic modules, i.e., modules with one generator.

If M is a free module over a principal ideal domain R, then every submodule of M is again free. This does not hold for modules over arbitrary rings, as the example    of  modules over  shows.

Properties
In a principal ideal domain, any two elements  have a greatest common divisor, which may be obtained as a generator of the ideal .

All Euclidean domains are principal ideal domains, but the converse is not true.

Every principal ideal domain is a unique factorization domain (UFD). The converse does not hold since for any UFD , the ring   of polynomials in 2 variables is a UFD but is not a PID. (To prove this look at the ideal generated by  It is not the whole ring since it contains no polynomials of degree 0, but it cannot be generated by any one single element.)

Every principal ideal domain is Noetherian.
In all unital rings, maximal ideals are prime. In principal ideal domains a near converse holds: every nonzero prime ideal is maximal.
All principal ideal domains are integrally closed.

The previous three statements give the definition of a Dedekind domain, and hence every principal ideal domain is a Dedekind domain.

Let A be an integral domain. Then the following are equivalent.

 A is a PID.
 Every prime ideal of A is principal.
 A is a Dedekind domain that is a UFD.
 Every finitely generated ideal of A is principal (i.e., A is a Bézout domain) and A satisfies the ascending chain condition on principal ideals.
 A admits a Dedekind–Hasse norm.

Any Euclidean norm is a Dedekind-Hasse norm; thus, (5) shows that a Euclidean domain is a PID. (4) compares to:
 An integral domain is a UFD if and only if it is a GCD domain (i.e., a domain where every two elements have a greatest common divisor) satisfying the ascending chain condition on principal ideals.
An integral domain is a Bézout domain if and only if any two elements in it have a gcd that is a linear combination of the two. A Bézout domain is thus a GCD domain, and (4) gives yet another proof that a PID is a UFD.

See also 
Bézout's identity

Notes

References
 Michiel Hazewinkel, Nadiya Gubareni, V. V. Kirichenko. Algebras, rings and modules. Kluwer Academic Publishers, 2004. 
 John B. Fraleigh, Victor J. Katz. A first course in abstract algebra. Addison-Wesley Publishing Company. 5 ed., 1967. 
 Nathan Jacobson. Basic Algebra I. Dover, 2009. 
 Paulo Ribenboim. Classical theory of algebraic numbers. Springer, 2001.

External links 
 Principal ring on MathWorld

Commutative algebra
Ring theory